"Let Down" is a song by the English rock band Radiohead, from their third studio album OK Computer (1997). It was released as a promotional single in September 1997, and reached number 29 on the US Modern Rock Tracks chart. It was included on Radiohead: The Best Of (2008).

Background and recording
"Let Down"  was intended to be the first single from OK Computer, but "Paranoid Android" was chosen instead, which, along with "Karma Police", solidified the band's popularity. The track was ultimately not released as a single because the band was unsatisfied with the video they had produced, and ended up losing money. The song reached #29 in the US Hot Modern Rock tracks chart.

The song was recorded at St Catherine's Court mansion ballroom. Thom Yorke apparently was inspired to write the song while sitting in a pub, noting the customers "clinging on to bottles" and sensing in them the "emptiest of feelings," a sense of disappointment.

Live performances
The band has rarely performed "Let Down" live. After a 2006 performance, the song was not featured on any of the band's concert setlists for ten years until it was revived on the tour supporting A Moon Shaped Pool. The multi-track recording used in the studio version makes the song difficult to recreate live, especially with respect to the layering of multiple simultaneous vocal parts sung by Yorke. When it has been played live, Yorke has typically opted to skip the final verse and sing the accompanying background vocal part instead.

Influence and cover versions
In 2006 the song was covered by reggae musicians Toots & the Maytals for the Easy Star All Stars compilation album Radiodread, a complete makeover of OK Computer in ska, dub and reggae musical styles.  An equally melancholy cover of the song is performed by Pedro the Lion on their 2005 live release Tour E.P.  The electronic artist Let Down Loser got his name from this song.

Track listing
CD promo single
 "Let Down" – 4:59
 "Let Down (Edit)" – 4:27
 "Karma Police" – 4:21

Personnel
Radiohead
 Colin Greenwood
 Jonny Greenwood
 Ed O'Brien
 Philip Selway
 Thom Yorke

Additional personnel
 Stanley Donwood – illustrations
 Nigel Godrich – production, engineering

Charts

References

Bibliography

 
 
 

1997 songs
1997 singles
Radiohead songs
Songs written by Thom Yorke
Songs written by Jonny Greenwood
Songs written by Ed O'Brien
Songs written by Colin Greenwood
Songs written by Philip Selway
Song recordings produced by Nigel Godrich
Parlophone singles
Capitol Records singles